Robert Keith McCully (February 8, 1912 – August 15, 1993) was a Canadian professional ice hockey right winger who played in one National Hockey League game for the Montreal Canadiens during the 1934–35 NHL season.

See also
List of players who played only one game in the NHL

External links

1912 births
1993 deaths
Canadian ice hockey right wingers
Ice hockey people from Ontario
Montreal Canadiens players
New Haven Eagles players
Oshawa Generals players
Philadelphia Ramblers players
Providence Reds players
Sportspeople from Stratford, Ontario
Springfield Indians players